Ardenne Métropole is the communauté d'agglomération, an intercommunal structure, centred on the cities of Charleville-Mézières and Sedan. It is located in the Ardennes department, in the Grand Est region, northern France. It was created as Communauté d'agglomération de Charleville-Mézières-Sedan in January 2014 by the merger of the former Communauté d'agglomération Cœur d'Ardenne with 3 former communautés de communes and 12 other communes. Its seat is in Charleville-Mézières. The communauté d'agglomération was renamed Ardenne Métropole in January 2017. Its population was 122,016 in 2017, of which 46,428 in Charleville-Mézières.

Composition
The communauté d'agglomération consists of the following 58 communes:

Aiglemont
Arreux
Les Ayvelles
Balan
Bazeilles
Belval
Chalandry-Elaire
La Chapelle
Charleville-Mézières
Cheveuges
Cliron
Daigny
Damouzy
Dom-le-Mesnil
Donchery
Étrépigny
Fagnon
Fleigneux
Flize
Floing
Francheval
La Francheville
Gernelle
Gespunsart
Givonne
Glaire
La Grandville
Hannogne-Saint-Martin
Haudrecy
Houldizy
Illy
Issancourt-et-Rumel
Lumes
La Moncelle
Montcy-Notre-Dame
Neufmanil
Nouvion-sur-Meuse
Nouzonville
Noyers-Pont-Maugis
Pouru-aux-Bois
Pouru-Saint-Remy
Prix-lès-Mézières
Saint-Aignan
Saint-Laurent
Saint-Menges
Sapogne-et-Feuchères
Sécheval
Sedan
Thelonne
Tournes
Villers-Semeuse
Villers-sur-Bar
Ville-sur-Lumes
Vivier-au-Court
Vrigne-aux-Bois
Vrigne-Meuse
Wadelincourt
Warcq

References

Agglomeration communities in France
Intercommunalities of Ardennes